Domagoj Kapetanović (30 January 1926 – 2005) was a Yugoslav football player and manager best known for winning the 1976 NASL Championship with Toronto Metros-Croatia.

Playing career
Kapetanović started his playing career with Građanski. After the club was disbanded by a decree of the communist authorities in 1945, he was one of several Građanski players who went on to join the Belgrade-based FK Partizan, along with Franjo Glaser, Zlatko Čajkovski, Stjepan Bobek, Miroslav Brozović and others. He also played for NK Lokomotiva, Dinamo Zagreb and Metalac.

Managerial career
As manager, he coached Dinamo Zagreb in 1973, and several Croat clubs abroad, such as Toronto Metros-Croatia in Canada and Croatia Sydney in Australia. With Toronto, he won the Soccer Bowl '76.

References

1926 births
2005 deaths
People from Ljubuški
Croats of Bosnia and Herzegovina
Yugoslav footballers
Association football midfielders
HŠK Građanski Zagreb players
FK Partizan players
NK Lokomotiva Zagreb players
GNK Dinamo Zagreb players
Yugoslav First League players
Yugoslav football managers
FK Velež Mostar managers
NK Zagreb managers
OFI Crete F.C. managers
GNK Dinamo Zagreb managers
Al-Ahly SC (Benghazi) managers
Toronto Blizzard managers
NK Osijek managers
Sydney United 58 FC managers
Melbourne Knights FC managers
Melbourne Knights FC players
North American Soccer League (1968–1984) coaches
Yugoslav expatriate football managers
Expatriate football managers in Greece
Yugoslav expatriate sportspeople in Greece
Expatriate football managers in Libya
Expatriate soccer managers in Canada
Yugoslav expatriate sportspeople in Canada
Expatriate soccer managers in Australia
Yugoslav expatriate sportspeople in Australia
Yugoslav expatriate sportspeople in Libya